G. juncea may refer to:

 Galeandra juncea, a tropical orchid
 Galvezia juncea, a plant native to Mexico
 Genista juncea, a plant with very small leaves